Line 3 of the Nanning Metro is a rapid transit line in Nanning. The line opened on 6 June 2019. The line is 27.9 km long with 23 stations.

Opening timeline

Stations

References

03
Railway lines opened in 2019
2019 establishments in China